John Burridge (born 3 December 1951), nicknamed Budgie, is an English former goalkeeper who is now working with Indian Super League club Kerala Blasters as their goalkeeping consultant and senior goalkeeping coach for their goalkeeping academy. In his senior career he played for 29 clubs, 18 of them in the Football League, in a career that lasted nearly 30 years. Overall, Burridge played 768 league games in the English and Scottish leagues, and several more at non-league level.

Playing career
Born in Workington, Burridge grew up in the Cumbrian mining village of Great Clifton. He began his professional career at his local club, Workington, signing-up at the age of 15. He played his first league game in 1969.

In 1971, he was transferred to Blackpool, initially on loan at the end of the 1970–71 season, then permanently for the start of 1971–72. It was with the Seasiders that he won his first honour: the Anglo-Italian Cup. Blackpool beat Bologna 2–1, after extra time, at the latter's Stadio Comunale on 12 June 1971. Burridge's performance earned him the praise of the normally highly-critical Italian fans.

In 1975, Burridge joined Aston Villa for £75,000. He was signed by Ron Saunders and spent two seasons at Villa Park, winning the League Cup with them, but eventually lost his place to Jimmy Rimmer. He had a short but successful loan spell at Southend United before joining Crystal Palace in 1978, signed by Terry Venables. In a 4–1 victory over Ipswich Town, after Palace went 4–0 up, Burridge, to entertain the fans, sat on the crossbar. After two and a half seasons at Palace, he joined London rivals Queens Park Rangers, again signed by Venables. He was dropped in favour of Peter Hucker for the 1982 FA Cup Final.

In July 1982, Burridge joined his seventh club, Wolverhampton Wanderers. In the 1982–83 season in a game at Molineux, Wolves entertained Newcastle United. Prior to the game Burridge had made a bet with a stake of £100, with Kevin Keegan that Burridge would play the game in a Superman outfit. As a result of the bet, Wolves biggest crowd of the season, a crowd of 22500, witnessed Burridge playing the match in a Superman outfit. Burridge helped Wolves gain promotion to the top flight as runners-up, only to be relegated the following season. He left Wolves in October 1984 to join Sheffield United, signed by Ian Porterfield. He also had a loan spell at Derby County, signed by Arthur Cox, shortly before joining the Blades.

Burridge spent three seasons at Sheffield United before joining Southampton in 1987, signed by Chris Nicholl. Two years later, he moved to Newcastle United. After two years at Newcastle United, he moved to Scotland to join Hibernian, where he won a Scottish League Cup winners' medal. After two years in Edinburgh, Burridge returned to Newcastle for a second spell at the club in 1993, signed by Kevin Keegan.

Despite being past 40, Burridge refused to hang up his gloves, and continued moving across the country for short spells at any club that requested his services. Between 1993 and 1997, Burridge played for no fewer than fourteen clubs. They were, in chronological order: Scarborough, Lincoln, Aberdeen, Dumbarton, Falkirk, Manchester City, (where he became, at 43 years, four months and 26 days, the oldest player to appear in the Premier League) Notts County, Witton Albion, Darlington, Grimsby, Gateshead, Northampton Town, Queen of the South, Blyth Spartans, Scarborough once more. These spells usually lasted no more than one or two games as an emergency goalkeeper. He finished his playing career with a brief spell as player-manager at Blyth Spartans in 1997, following a similarly brief spell back at Newcastle United as goalkeeping coach.

Blackpool F.C. Hall of Fame
Burridge was inducted into the Hall of Fame at Bloomfield Road, when it was officially opened by former Blackpool player Jimmy Armfield in April 2006. Organised by the Blackpool Supporters Association, Blackpool fans around the world voted on their all-time heroes. Five players from each decade are inducted; Burridge is in the 1970s.

Managerial and coaching career
In his second spell with Blyth Spartans, Burridge was the club's player-manager. On 15 November 1997, he took Spartans to his first club, Blackpool, in the first round of the FA Cup. The hosts won 4–3.

Burridge 'discovered' Oman international goalkeeper Ali Al-Habsi aged 16 in his first spell on the coaching staff of the Oman national football team and was instrumental in the player's transfer to Bolton Wanderers in January 2006. He has also coached English national goalkeepers Tim Flowers, Nigel Martyn and Paul Robinson.

Burridge worked as a goalkeeping coach for Al Ain Football Club in the United Arab Emirates. He was a regular guest for the launch of English Premier League show on the regional sports channel ART Prime Sports and a regular pundit on Starhub, Singapore's Football Channel. He is also a writer in the football column of Singapore newspaper, The New Paper. Burridge had a spell as a backup commentator along with Rob Lee for Ten Sports UEFA Champions League fixtures and resident pundit on The Football Channel in Singapore, before returning to work for the Oman national team as goalkeeper coach. He was dismissed by Oman in January 2011.

As of January 2012, Burridge is working as a television pundit for Ten Sports on their football show C2K on TEN Action along with Joe Morrison and Carlton Palmer. Together they cover UEFA Champions League and UEFA Europa League football from Dubai.

in September 2015, he was the goalkeeping coach for the LionsXII which plays in the Malaysian Super League.

In August 2016, it was reported that he had joined Global F.C. of the United Football League, although the appointment was short-lived as Burridge did not have the necessary coaching badge.

In July 2019, he was signed by the Indian Super League top division club Kerala Blasters as their goalkeeping consultant for goalkeeping academy.

Attitude to conditioning and innovation
 Unusually for a player in the 1970s, 1980s and 1990s, Burridge was a teetotaller. He also went against the grain with his diet. In the 1970s Burridge noted players would eat steaks, or even fish and chips for prematch meals, whereas Burridge, studying sport science, and the diets of African tribesmen, sensing something was not right with the way footballers generally fuelled and refuelled, and finding fault with the timing of their fuelling, would carb up with quick meals like baby food, pasta and potatoes. He would drink glasses of water instead of a cup of tea. Perplexing the people of the time period, Burridge would also make fruit smoothies before many had considered the concept of blending fruits for nutrition.

In the 1980s, on winning runs, warming up he would do somersaults to entertain the fans, which Burridge noted was frowned upon by the echelons in the game though Burridge did not care for their sentiments, or their belief as to what was the correct way to warm up.

In the 1970s Burridge would also be among the first goalkeepers to use Latex gloves; he would also introduce Peter Shilton and Pat Jennings to latex gloves.

Personal life
Burridge is married to Janet, whom he met while with Blackpool. His son, Tom, played ice hockey for Blackburn Hawks. John Burridge's autobiography, entitled "Budgie" was released on 4 April 2011.

Honours
Blackpool
 Anglo-Italian Cup: 1971

Aston Villa
 Football League Cup: 1977

Crystal Palace
 Football League Second Division: 1978–79

Wolverhampton Wanderers
 Football League Second Division runner-up: 1982–83

Hibernian
 Scottish League Cup: 1991

References

Sources

External links
 
 
 Burridge in the Blackpool Supporters Association Hall of Fame

Kerala Blasters FC non-playing staff
1951 births
Living people
Sportspeople from Workington
English footballers
Association football goalkeepers
Workington A.F.C. players
Blackpool F.C. players
Aston Villa F.C. players
Southend United F.C. players
Crystal Palace F.C. players
Queens Park Rangers F.C. players
Wolverhampton Wanderers F.C. players
Derby County F.C. players
Sheffield United F.C. players
Southampton F.C. players
Newcastle United F.C. players
Hibernian F.C. players
Scarborough F.C. players
Lincoln City F.C. players
Enfield F.C. players
Aberdeen F.C. players
Dunfermline Athletic F.C. players
Dumbarton F.C. players
Falkirk F.C. players
Manchester City F.C. players
Notts County F.C. players
Darlington F.C. players
Grimsby Town F.C. players
Gateshead F.C. players
Northampton Town F.C. players
Thurrock F.C. players
Queen of the South F.C. players
Blyth Spartans A.F.C. players
Blyth Spartans A.F.C. managers
Premier League players
English Football League players
Scottish Football League players
Witton Albion F.C. players
Newcastle United F.C. non-playing staff
English football managers
Al Ain FC managers
United Football League (Philippines) head coaches
Global Makati F.C. managers
Association football goalkeeping coaches
Footballers from Cumbria